Marco Guzzo (born 15 April 1994) is an Italian footballer who plays for FC Nervesa.

Biography
Guzzo was a player of A.C. Milan. He won the Allievi League with the under-17 team in 2011 as the captain.
On 25 July 2012 Guzzo and Carlo Alberto Calvetti were signed by Hellas Verona F.C. in co-ownership deal for a peppercorn fee. In January 2013 Verona acquired Guzzo outright. On 29 January he moved to Serie A club Siena in another co-ownership for €275,000, as part of the deal that Paolo Grossi moved to Verona also for €275,000. Guzzo immediately moved back to Verona.

In July 2013 he remained in Verona for the third professional team of the city - newly promoted side Virtus Verona. He was booked in the match against Real Vicenza in 2013–14 Coppa Italia Lega Pro.

References

External links
 
 
 Marco Guzzo at ZeroZero

Italian footballers
A.C. Milan players
Hellas Verona F.C. players
A.C.N. Siena 1904 players
Serie C players
Association football defenders
People from Montebelluna
Sportspeople from the Province of Treviso
1994 births
Living people
Footballers from Veneto